V. P. Khalid, also known as Cochin Nagesh (1951 – 24 June 2022) was an Indian Malayalam film actor and theatre artist. Khalid was a member of several professional drama troupes. In 1973, he made his movie debut through Periyar directed by P. J. Antony. He rose to fame among the television audience for his role as ‘Sumeshettan’ in Malayalam series Marimayam, aired in Mazhavil Manorama. He died on 25 June 2022 at a film location in Vaikom after suffering a cardiac arrest.

Career
Khalid started his career as a drama artist at the age of 16. He came as a replacement in that play and won the best comedian award for his performance in the play. He was a member of several professional drama troupes such as Alleppey Theatres and Cochin Sanathana. Khalid had acted in plays like Dracaula, Ancham Thirumurivu and Ezhunallathu. In 1973, he made his big screen debut. He is known for his roles in movies such as Kanal Kaattu, Sunday Holiday, Ponnapuram Kotta, Anuraga Karikkin Vellam, Vikruthi and Puzhu.

References

Indian male film actors
Male actors from Kerala
Male actors in Malayalam cinema
21st-century Indian male actors
Indian male television actors
Male actors in Malayalam television
1951 births
2022 deaths